The Collège de la Sainte Famille, often abbreviated as CSF and referred to as Jésuites, is a private French Catholic international school for boys run by the Near East province of the Society of Jesus in Cairo, Egypt. It was founded in 1879, following a request by Pope Leo XIII for a seminary to help prepare students to become priests.

History 
The college began with 16 pupils, in 1879, at the Boghos Palace of Mouski. In 1882 today's college was inaugurated in Faggala. The current Ramses Street was occupied by the Ismailia Canal. The transportation of students was by fiacres. The college had 112 students.

Thereafter was built: the church (1891), the theatre (1892), the current building of Preparatory Cycle (1925), the Primary Cycle in Downtown Cairo (1930), and the Primary Cycle in Heliopolis (1934). In 1930, the college had 600 students from 14 nations: Egypt, France, Lebanon, Syria, Italy, Greece, England, Switzerland, Spain, Yugoslavia, Turkey, Czechoslovakia, Russia, Persia.

Notable alumni 
 Boutros Boutros Ghali - Former UN Secretary General and former Egyptian foreign minister
 Prince Abbas Hilmi -  member of the Egyptian Royal Family from the Muhammad Ali dynasty
 Mourad Wahba Pasha - Egyptian high court judge and former Cabinet Minister
 Wassef Boutros Ghali Pasha - former Egyptian Minister of Foreign Affairs
 Maximos V Hakim - late Melkite Greek Catholic Patriarch
 Georges Corm - Lebanese economist and former Minister of Finance of Lebanon
 Henri Curiel - left-wing activist and founder of the Democratic Movement for National Liberation
 Gilbert Sinoué - French author and screenwriter
 Ahmed Afifi - CEEMEA Trade Finance Head, J.P. Morgan Chase Bank 
 Monir Fakhri Abdel Nour - former Minister of Tourism
 Magued Osman - former Minister of Communications and Information Technology
 Mohsen Badawi -  businessman and founding member of the Canada Egypt Business Council
 Ramy Lakah - Egyptian-French businessman
 Robert Solé - French writer and journalist of Egyptian origin
 Hussein fahmy - 110m hurdles Egyptian record holder (U20)
 Nagy Habib -  Professor of Surgery, Imperial College, London
 Hisham Selim -  actor
 Victor Credi - Award winning Director of Photography
 Mohamed Imam -  actor
 Tarek Nour - founder and CEO of Tarek Nour Advertising
 Amr El Barbary - CEO of Palm Hills Properties
 Louis Fattal - Egyptian-French photographer 
 Fouad Mansour - Editor in Chief Al-Ahram Hebdo, Ahram Online
 Hassan Kami - Egyptian actor and opera singer

Notable faculty 
 Pierre Teilhard de Chardin - Jesuit, Priest, idealist philosopher, paleontologist and mystic
 James J. Mullooly Ph.D., Professor of Anthropology, California State University, Fresno

See also

 List of Jesuit educational institutions

Notes

External links 
 Official website 
 (English)
 Alumni
  Petit Collège website 
 El Fagr newspaper 
  Bac Français website 

Catholic secondary schools in Egypt
French international schools in Egypt
International schools in Cairo
Educational institutions established in 1879
Private schools in Cairo
Boys' schools in Egypt
Jesuit schools in Egypt
1879 establishments in Egypt